The 1925 Stockport by-election was a by-election held for the British House of Commons constituency of Stockport in Cheshire on 17 September 1925.  The by-election was won by the Labour Party candidate Arnold Townend.

Vacancy 
The Conservative MP William Greenwood had died on 19 August 1925, aged 50. He had held the seat since his election as a Coalition Conservative at a by-election in 1920.

Candidates 
The Liberal Party candidate was 55-year-old Henry Fildes, who had been also been elected at the 1920 by-election as one of the constituency's two MPs, but lost his seat at the 1923 general election. He had not contested the 1924 general election.

The Labour Party candidate was 45-year-old Arnold Townend, who had been unsuccessful in Manchester Blackley at the 1918 and 1922 general elections.

The Conservative candidate was T. Eastham.

Result 
On a high turnout, the vote split three ways, and Townend won the seat for Labour only 36.5% of the votes.  He was re-elected at the 1929 general election, but heavily defeated at the 1931 general election when Labour split over Ramsay MacDonald's formation of a National Government.

See also
Stockport (UK Parliament constituency)
Stockport
1920 Stockport by-election
List of United Kingdom by-elections (1918–1931)

Notes

References 
 

By-elections to the Parliament of the United Kingdom in Greater Manchester constituencies
Stockport by-election
Stockport by-election
20th century in Cheshire
Politics of the Metropolitan Borough of Stockport
By-elections to the Parliament of the United Kingdom in Cheshire constituencies
Stockport by-election